The Lawashi River is a river in Unorganized Kenora District in Northwestern Ontario, Canada. The river is a tributary of James Bay.

Course
The river begins at an unnamed lake and heads east then northeast.

Tributaries
Lawashi Channel

See also
List of rivers of Ontario

References

Rivers of Kenora District
Tributaries of James Bay